General Schultz may refer to:

Harald Schultz (1895–1957), German Wehrmacht major general
Paul Schultz (1891–1964), German Wehrmacht major general
Roger C. Schultz (born 1945), U.S. Army lieutenant general

See also
Gerd Schultze-Rhonhof (born 1939), German Army major general
Richard Scholtes (born 1934), U.S. Army major general
Friedrich von Scholtz (1851–1927), Imperial German Army general
General Schulz (disambiguation)